¿Spicchiology? is the second album from XXL, the collaborative effort of experimental rock bands Larsen and Xiu Xiu.

Track listing

External links
 ¿Spicchiology? at Important Records.

2007 albums
Xiu Xiu albums
Collaborative albums
Important Records albums